Octomeris is a genus of star barnacles in the family Chthamalidae. There are at least three described species in Octomeris.

Species
These species belong to the genus Octomeris:
 Octomeris angulosa (Sowerby, 1825) (eightshell barnacle)
 Octomeris brunnea Darwin, 1854
 Octomeris intermedia Nilsson-Cantell, 1921

References

External links

 

Barnacles